The Flags and Emblems (Display) Act (Northern Ireland) 1954 (1954 c. 10) was an Act of the Parliament of Northern Ireland, passed in 1954. It was repealed under the direct rule of the British government, by the Public Order (Northern Ireland) Order 1987.

It was bitterly resented by nationalists, who saw the Act as being deliberately designed to suppress their identity. It did not refer explicitly to the Irish tricolour, inlike for the Union Flag. The Act gave the Royal Ulster Constabulary a positive duty to remove any flag or emblem from public or private property which was considered to be likely to cause a breach of the peace, but legally exempted the Union Flag from ever being considered a breach of the peace. As a result, of all the flags likely to be displayed in Northern Ireland, the Irish tricolour would alnost exclusivel ybe deemed a breach of the peace. However, the Act was not a wholesale ban on the Irish flag, and it was often allowed to remain flying, especially at GAA grounds.

The Act was introduced at a time of some turmoil within unionism in Northern Ireland, dissent that was viewed with alarm by the Ulster Unionist government, and the legislation was initiated amid the pressure emanating from that dissent. Hard-line unionists accused the government of appeasing nationalists. A more lenient approach by government to some nationalist parades had led to an increase in the flying of the Irish tricolour. Likewise, the Coronation celebrations had led to the erection of Union Flags not only in unionist enclaves but also in nationalist areas in which disputes erupted, and some Union Flags were taken down and replaced with tricolours. Nationalists had also organised boycotts of shops which openly celebrated the coronation with the display of the Union Flag, increasing tension and unionist fears. The Act took over some of the powers of the Civil Authorities (Special Powers) Act (Northern Ireland) 1922.

Violations of the Act were punishable by up to a fine up to £500, or up to five years in prison.

The enforcement of the Act could on occasion lead to rioting, most notoriously during the general election of 1964 on the lower Falls Road in Belfast.

Reading
Henry Patterson, Party versus order: Ulster Unionism and the Flags and Emblems Act, Contemporary British History, Vol. 13, No. 4 (Winter 1999), pp. 105–129.
Henry Patterson Ireland Since 1939, Penguin Ireland, 2007
Andrew Gailey Crying in the Wilderness: Jack Sayers, a Liberal Editor in Ulster, 1939-69, Institute of Irish Studies, Queen's University Belfast, 1995

External links
Full text of the Act

Acts of the Parliament of Northern Ireland 1954
Flag controversies